The ecclesiastical parishes within the Diocese of Bath and Wells cover the majority of the English county of Somerset and small areas of Devon, Dorset, Gloucestershire and Wiltshire. The episcopal seat of the Bishop of Bath and Wells is in the Cathedral Church of Saint Andrew in the city of Wells in Somerset.

The diocesan offices, the bishops' offices and residences and the cathedral are all located around the Bishop's Palace in Wells. The diocese is not referred to as "Bath diocese" or "Wells diocese", but as "Bath and Wells diocese". The ordinary of the diocese is the diocesan Bishop of Bath and Wells, Peter Hancock; he is assisted throughout the diocese by the Bishop suffragan of Taunton, Ruth Worsley. Her See was created in 1911. 

Alternative episcopal oversight (for parishes in the diocese that reject the ministry of women priests) is provided by the provincial episcopal visitor (PEV), the Bishop suffragan of Ebbsfleet, Jonathan Goodall. He is licensed as an honorary assistant bishop of the diocese in order to facilitate his work there.

The parish with its local parish church is the basic unit of the Church of England.  The parish within the Church of England structure has its roots in the Roman Catholic Church and survived the Reformation largely untouched.  Church of England parishes are currently each within one of 44 dioceses divided between the provinces of Canterbury, with 30 dioceses, and York with 14. In 2017 there were approximately 12,600 Church of England parishes in all, with 477 being within this diocese. 

Each parish is administered by a parish priest who may be assisted in his pastoral duties by a curate or curates, who are also ordained but not parish priests. There are wide variations in the size of parishes and church-going populations. A parish priest may have responsibility for one parish or for two or more, and some are part of a team ministry. By extension, the term parish refers not only to the territorial unit but to the people of its community or congregation. A benefice or "living" in the Church of England describes any ecclesiastical parish or group of ecclesiastical parishes under a single stipendiary minister. The holder of a benefice owns the "freehold" of the post (the church and the parsonage house) for life. 

Until the late 19th century, the parishes were the smallest area for local government and administrative functions. Following the Local Government Act 1894, the civil duties of the church were abolished and separate civil parishes were established. As a result of the different needs of the civil community and the church, in many cases the boundaries of the ecclesiastical parishes and their equivalent civil parish have diverged with time.

Archdeaconry of Bath

The archdeaconry covers most of the two unitary authorities of North Somerset and Bath and North East Somerset, and also includes sections of neighbouring districts in Somerset and Wiltshire. The Archdeacon of Bath is Adrian Youings.

Deanery of Bath
The deanery is mostly within Bath and North East Somerset, but includes one civil parish in Wiltshire and a small section in South Gloucestershire. As well as covering the city of Bath, it also includes the surrounding suburbs of the city and neighbouring villages.

Deanery of Chew Magna

The area covered includes the Chew Valley, and surrounding areas. The deanery is mostly within Bath and North East Somerset, and also includes a portion of North Somerset, Mendip and Sedgemoor. Part of the area falls within the Mendip Hills Area of Outstanding Natural Beauty. Most of the rural area is within the Bristol and Bath Green Belt.

Deanery of Locking

The Deanery of Locking covers Weston-super-Mare and the surrounding villages. It is mostly within North Somerset, but includes sections of Mendip and Sedgemoor.

Deanery of Midsomer Norton

The deanery covers Midsomer Norton, Radstock and the surrounding villages which made up the part of the Somerset Coalfield. The area is split between the local government areas of Bath and North East Somerset and Mendip.

Deanery of Portishead

The deanery covers the coastal towns of Portishead and Clevedon and the surrounding area. It is wholly within North Somerset.

Archdeaconry of Taunton

The archdeaconry is centred on Taunton and covers the west of Somerset. It also includes small sections of Devon and Dorset. The Archdeacon of Taunton is Simon Hill.

Deanery of Crewkerne

The deanery covers areas of South Somerset including Crewkerne and North Perrott, with many of the surrounding villages. Some of the parishes are just over the county border in West Dorset.

Deanery of Exmoor

The deanery covers large areas of Exmoor in West Somerset. The population is sparse and clustered around small towns and villages.

Deanery of Ilminster

The deanery covers villages in South Somerset and Taunton Deane, as well as a single parish in West Dorset and a small section of East Devon.

Deanery of Quantock

The deanery covers parishes in Sedgemoor and West Somerset.

Deanery of Sedgemoor

The deanery covers areas of Sedgemoor around Bridgwater, and the easternmost part of Taunton Deane.

Deanery of Taunton

The deanery covers the area around Taunton. It is mostly within Taunton Deane and includes a small section of Sedgemoor.

Deanery of Tone

The deanery covers parishes in the western half of Taunton Deane and part of West Somerset.

Archdeaconry of Wells

The archdeaconry covers the majority of Mendip, the eastern halves of Sedgemoor and South Somerset, as well as small sections in neighbouring districts in Somerset, Dorset and Wiltshire. Wells Cathedral is within the geographic extent of the archdeaconry, but is excluded from it. The Archdeacon of Wells is Anne Gell.

Deanery of Axbridge
The deanery is split between Sedgemoor and Mendip, and also includes one civil parish in North Somerset.

Deanery of Bruton and Cary
The deanery is mostly in South Somerset, but includes some civil parishes in Mendip and a small part of West Dorset.

Deanery of Frome

The deanery covers areas of Mendip around Frome, with one parish which stretches into Wiltshire.

Deanery of Glastonbury

The deanery covers parishes in several districts around Glastonbury and Street on the Somerset Levels.

Deanery of Ivelchester

The deanery covers parishes in South Somerset.

Deanery of Shepton Mallet
The deanery covers parishes in the Mendip area.

Deanery of Yeovil

The deanery includes parishes in South Somerset.

Extra-parochial areas
The area of central Wells, forming Wells St Andrew, a liberty around the cathedral and the Bishop's Palace is the only extra-parochial area within the diocese.

Footnotes

References

Diocese of Bath and Wells
Bath and Wells, Ecclesiastical parishes
Church of England lists
Somerset-related lists